Darcy Tucker (born March 15, 1975) is a Canadian former professional ice hockey player. He played most of his National Hockey League (NHL) career with the Toronto Maple Leafs. A sixth round draft choice, Tucker began his NHL career with the Montreal Canadiens. Throughout his NHL career he also played for the Tampa Bay Lightning and the Colorado Avalanche. Tucker was born in Castor, Alberta, but grew up in Endiang, Alberta. Tucker is of Métis descent.

Playing career
Tucker is one of three players, along with Tyson Nash and Ryan Huska, that were a part of all three Kamloops Blazers Memorial Cup wins in 1992, 1994 and 1995. In 1996, while playing for the Fredericton Canadiens of the American Hockey League (AHL), he won the Dudley "Red" Garrett Memorial Award as the AHL's top rookie.

Tucker was drafted in the sixth round, 151st overall, by the Montreal Canadiens in the 1993 NHL Entry Draft. He was traded to the Tampa Bay Lightning with Stéphane Richer and David Wilkie for Patrick Poulin, Igor Ulanov and Mick Vukota in 1998, where he played for three seasons before being traded to the Toronto Maple Leafs in 2000 for Mike Johnson.

Tucker became notorious on Long Island during the 2002 Stanley Cup playoffs after he lowbridged the New York Islanders' captain Michael Peca during Game 5 of the first round. The check blew out Peca's MCL and ACL on his left knee, ending his playoff campaign and delaying his entry into the 2002–03 season. No penalty was assessed. In the 2006 off-season, the Leafs signed Peca to a one-year contract, making Tucker and Peca teammates.

On June 24, 2008, Tucker became an unrestricted free agent after the Maple Leafs bought-out the remainder of his contract, paying Tucker $1 million per year over six years. On July 1, 2008, he signed a two-year, $4.5 million contract with the Colorado Avalanche.

On October 1, 2010, as a free agent just prior to the 2010–11 season, Tucker announced his retirement from professional hockey after 14 seasons in the NHL. He remained around the game as a player agent.

Personal
In 1998, Tucker married Shannon Corson, the sister of former NHL player Shayne Corson. Shayne and Tucker were teammates on the Maple Leafs for three seasons, and Tucker frequently helped him deal with his panic attacks. Tucker and his wife have three children.

Career statistics

Regular season and playoffs

International

Awards

References

External links

Darcy Tucker Official Website

1975 births
Canadian ice hockey left wingers
Colorado Avalanche players
Ice hockey people from Alberta
Kamloops Blazers players
Living people
Montreal Canadiens players
Montreal Canadiens draft picks
People from the County of Paintearth No. 18
People from the County of Stettler No. 6
Tampa Bay Lightning players
Toronto Maple Leafs players
Métis sportspeople